The Southern Hotel in Covington, Louisiana, is located in the Division of St. John Historic District also known as the Covington Historic District, a historic district which was listed on the National Register of Historic Places in 1982.

The hotel is a local landmark.  It is a two-story commercial brick building with shopfronts on the ground level, built in 1907.  In 1982, it was undergoing restoration.  It consisted of 305, 307, 313, 315, and 317 New Hampshire, and  426, 428, 430, 434 Boston.  It has "two corner projecting pavilions, matching balconies on the wings, fixed awnings with overhead transoms, arched windows with arched lintels, and elaborate brackets."

It is a member of the Historic Hotels of America.  It dates from 1907.  It was reopened as a hotel in 2014.

References

External links

Hotels in Louisiana
Covington, Louisiana
National Register of Historic Places in St. Tammany Parish, Louisiana
Historic Hotels of America